Željko Janović (born 20 January 1963) is a retired Montenegrin professional football forward, who played for Budućnost, Salamanca, Istres, Penafiel, Gil Vicente and Moreirense.

References

External links
 
 forum.b92.net
 
 hemeroteca.lavanguardia.com

1963 births
Living people
Footballers from Podgorica
Association football forwards
Yugoslav footballers
Serbia and Montenegro footballers
Montenegrin footballers
FK Budućnost Podgorica players
UD Salamanca players
FC Istres players
F.C. Penafiel players
Gil Vicente F.C. players
Moreirense F.C. players
Yugoslav First League players
Yugoslav Second League players
Ligue 2 players
Segunda División players
Segunda División B players
Liga Portugal 2 players
Primeira Liga players
Yugoslav expatriate footballers
Expatriate footballers in Spain
Yugoslav expatriate sportspeople in Spain
Serbia and Montenegro expatriate footballers
Expatriate footballers in France
Serbia and Montenegro expatriate sportspeople in France
Expatriate footballers in Portugal

Montenegrin expatriate sportspeople in Portugal